Maculonaclia leopardina is a moth of the  subfamily Arctiinae. It was described by Rothschild in 1911. It is found in Madagascar.

References
Citations

Bibliography
 Natural History Museum Lepidoptera generic names catalog

Arctiinae
Moths described in 1911